Friendship, Maryland may refer to the following places in Maryland:
Friendship, Anne Arundel County, Maryland
Friendship, Worcester County, Maryland